Kathleen Pettingill (born 27 March, 1935) is the matriarch of the Melbourne criminal family, the Pettingill family.

Family
Pettingill's 10 children are:

(with Dennis Ryan)
Dennis Bruce Allen (1951–1987) – a drug dealer, jailed for rape in 1973 and died in 1987 of a heart attack while in custody awaiting trial for murder.
Peter Allen (born 1953) – convicted of armed robbery, who was once Victoria's most dangerous man and spent 28 years in jail.

(with William George "Billy" Peirce (died 1968))
Vicki or Vicky Brooks (born 1954; née Pettingill) – gave evidence against the family in the Walsh Street trial and subsequently went into witness protection.
"Shelley" (born 1956) – real name unknown. Placed for adoption and reestablished contact with Pettingill in 1989.
"Stephen" (born 1957) – real name unknown. Placed for adoption and reestablished contact with Pettingill in 1989.
Victor George Peirce (1958–2002) – acquitted of the 1988 Walsh Street police shootings and was killed in 2002.
Lex Peirce (born 1960) – has a minor criminal record.
"David" (born 1961) – real name unknown. Placed for adoption and whereabouts currently unknown.

(with Jimmy Pettingill (died 1972))
Jamie Pettingill (1963–1985) – died of a heroin overdose aged 21.
Trevor Pettingill (born 1965) – acquitted of the 1988 Walsh Street police shootings, who has multiple convictions for firearms and drug-related offences and has served several jail terms. He has been described as a "career criminal".

Personal life 
Pettingill first worked in a bar, and having herself been a prostitute, she went on to run brothels. She lived with her children in the Richmond area of Melbourne, and a number of her sons were sent to the Turana Boys' Home. 

Pettingill has a glass eye in place of the one she lost after being shot in 1978 by Kim Nelson and Keryn Thompson. The bullet passed through a closed door at the Collingwood Housing Commission of Victoria flats as she and her son, Dennis Allen, attempted to repay a $300 debt on behalf of her daughter, Vicky Brooks.

In popular culture 
A biography of her life, The Matriarch: The Kathy Pettingill Story, was written by Adrian Tame and published in 1996. As of 2007, Pettingill was living in Venus Bay, Gippsland, Victoria.

In the 2011 miniseries Killing Time, Pettingill is a major character, played by Kris McQuade.

Fictionalized versions of Pettingill, as the character Janine "Smurf" Cody, have appeared in both the 2010 Australian film Animal Kingdom portrayed by Jacki Weaver, and the 2016 TNT television show of the same name portrayed by Ellen Barkin.  Weaver was nominated for an Academy Award in the Best Supporting Actress category for her performance.

References

External links
Father's fury at Walsh St admission -  Herald Sun, 2 October 2005

1935 births
Living people
Australian brothel owners and madams
Australian drug traffickers
Australian female prostitutes
Australian female criminals
Criminals from Melbourne
Place of birth missing (living people)
Kath
Female organized crime figures
Australian people with disabilities